The 2010 European Junior Swimming Championships were held from 14 to 18 July 2010 in Helsinki, Finland. The Championships were organized by LEN, the European Swimming League, and were held in a 50 m pool. Ages for competitors, per LEN rules are: girls-15 or 16 years old; boys-17 or 18 years old.

The 2010 Championships were held in the same country, and the week after, the 2010 European Junior Championships for diving (9-13 July in Helsinki, Finland) and synchronized swimming (7-11 July in Tampere, Finland). A 2010 European Junior Open Water Championships is also to be held; however, not in Finland, but rather in Hoorn, Netherlands on 31 July.

Participating countries
521 swimmers (279 boys, 242 girls) from 44 countries were entered in the event. Teams were from (with total team size following name):

 (1)
 (8)
 (6)
 (12)
 (5)
 (14)
 (1)
 (5)
 (17)
 (15)
 (1)
 (29)
 (29)
 (30)
 (40)
 (12)
 (9)
 (5)
 (2)
 (11)
 (27)
 (7)
 (8)
 (2)
 (6)
 (13)
 (10)
 (24)
 (10)
 (5)
 (36)
 (14)
 (7)
 (16)
 (24)
 (20)
 (5)
 (15)
 (20)

Schedule
Preliminary heats began at 9:00; Finals at 17:00. Prelims/semifinals/finals format used for events 200 m and under; prelim/finals used for events over 200 m. In 50 m events, prelims/semifinals/finals held on the same day; in 100 m and 200 m events, prelims/semis held on first day with finals the next event; and for 400 m+ events prelims/finals held the same day. Finals session order shown below.

Results

Boys

Girls

Medal table

References

Medal Table from the 2010 European Junior Swimming Championships.
Full Results (with points and splits) from the 2010 European Junior Swimming Championships.

European Junior Swimming Championships, 2010
European Junior Swimming Championships
2010 in Finnish sport
International aquatics competitions hosted by Finland
Swimming competitions in Finland
International sports competitions in Helsinki
European Junior Swimming Championship
2010s in Helsinki
Swimming